Office of the Registrar of the Newspapers for India (official name), more popularly known as Registrar of Newspapers for India (RNI), is a Government of India statutory body of Ministry of Information and Broadcasting for the registration of the publications, such as newspapers and magazines, India. It was established on 1 July 1956, on the recommendation of the First Press Commission in 1953 and by amending the Press and Registration of Books Act 1867. The Office of the Registrar of Newspapers for India is headquartered in New Delhi. RNI regulates and monitors printing and publication of newspapers based on the Press and Registration of Books Act, 1867 and the Registration of Newspapers (Central) Rules, 1956. The registrar is designated as Press Registrar, and Dhirendra Ojha a 1990 batch senior IIS officer is the current Press Registrar and Head of Department.  

The Press and Registration of Books Act contains the duties and functions of the RNI. On account of some more responsibilities entrusted upon RNI during all these years, the office is performing both statutory as well as some non-statutory functions. Online registration system was formally inaugurated in 2004 by the Information and Broadcasting Minister S. Jaipal Reddy.

Duties
Under statutory functions, RNI performs the following duties

 Compilation and maintenance of a Register of Newspapers containing particulars about all the newspapers published;
 Issue of Certificate of Registration to newspapers published under valid declaration;
 Scrutiny and analysis of annual statements sent by the publishers of newspapers every year under PRB Act containing information on circulation, ownership etc.;
 Informing district magistrates about availability of titles, to intending publishers for filing declaration;
 Ensuring that newspapers are published in accordance with the provisions of PRB Act 1867 and the rules made thereunder;
 Verification under Section 19-F of PRB Act, of circulation claims furnished by the publishers in their Annual Statements; and
 Preparation and submission to the Government on or before 31 December each year, a report containing all available information and statistics about the press in India with particular reference to the emerging trends in circulation and in the direction of common ownership units etc.

The following fall under the non-statutory functions:

 Formulation of Newsprint Allocation Policy – Guidelines and issue of Eligibility Certificate to the newspapers to enable them to import newsprint and to procure indigenous newsprint;
 Assessing and certifying the essential need and requirement of newspaper establishments to import printing and composing machinery and allied materials.

Registration

Registrar maintains the legal procedures for registering a newspaper, which can be summarised as:
As a first stage, the applicant applies for title verification of the publication to the jurisdictional District Magistrate. The District Magistrate will get the title verified from RNI.
After receiving the title verification letter from RNI, the applicant needs to file a declaration for authentication before District Magistrate.
After authentication, the newspaper must be published within 6 weeks if it is published once a week or oftener than that. In case of any other periodicity, the first issue should be published within 3 months from the date of authentication.
After the first issue is published, the applicant needs to file an application for RNI registration, enclosing the following documents
Title verification letter
Authenticated declaration
An affidavit for no foreign tie-up
First issue and latest issue of the publication
Content intimation/ confirmation in the prescribed form
Certificate intimating appointment of the printer

Registration of Publication
 All publications of India as well as publication imported in India for sales require the mandatory registration with RNI. They are also required to submit their annual report on circulation numbers.
 As of 31 March 2018, there are 17,573newspapers and 1,00,666 periodicals are registered with RNI.

See also 
 List of newspapers in India
 Media of India

References

External links 

 
 Registration guide
  The Press And Registration of Books Act, 1867

Regulatory agencies of India
Newspaper publishing in India
Ministry of Information and Broadcasting (India)
Organisations based in Delhi
Government agencies established in 1956
Mass media in India
1956 establishments in Delhi